Jean-Baptiste-Joseph Junbient Philadelphe Regnault-Warin (28 December 1773, Bar-le-Duc – 4 November 1844, Paris) was an 18th–19th-century French novelist, playwright and pamphleteer.

Main publications 
 Éléments de politique, 1790 ;
 La Constitution française mise à la portée de tout le monde, 2 vol. in-8°, Paris 1791 ;
 Éloge de Mirabeau ;
 Vie de J. Pétion, maire de Paris : Cours d’études encyclopédique ;
 La Caverne de Strozi ;
 Homéo et Juliette, historical novel ;
 Le Cimetière de la Madeleine, 4 vol. in-12, Paris, 1800 ; (the book which had several printings was translated into different languages.)
 La Jeunesse de Figaro ;
 Le Tonneau de Diogène, 2 vol. in-12 ;
 Les Prisonniers du Temple, sequel to Cimetière de la Madeleine, 3 vol. in-12 ;
 Le Paquebot de Calais à Douvres, roman politique et moral, in 12, 1802 ; (police authorized the publication only with many warnings inserted.)
 Spinalba, novel, 4 vol. in-12,1803 ;
 L’Homme au masque de fer, 4 vol. in-12, 1804 ;
 Loisirs littéraires, 1804 ;
 Mme de Maintenon, 4 vol. in-12 ;
 Henri II, duc de Montmorency, maréchal de France, historical novel, in-8°, 1815 ;
 L’Esprit de Mme de Staël, 2 vol. in-8° ;
 Biographie héroïque, in-12. 1818;
 Mémoires et Correspondance de l’impératrice Joséphine, 2 vol. in-8° ; (this book was disowned by Prince Eugène Beauharnais).
 Les Carbonari, ou le Livre de sang, 2 vol. in-12 ;
 Mémoires pour servir à la vie de Lafayette, 2 vol in-8°, 1824 ;
 Chronique indiscrète du XIXe, in-8°, 1825.

References

External links 
 Jean-Joseph Regnault-Warin on Data.bnf.fr

18th-century French writers
18th-century French male writers
18th-century French dramatists and playwrights
18th-century French novelists
19th-century French novelists
1773 births
People from Bar-le-Duc
1844 deaths